CHOM-FM is an English-language radio station located in Montreal, Quebec, Canada. Owned and operated by Bell Media, it broadcasts on 97.7 MHz from the Mount Royal candelabra tower, with an effective radiated power of 41,200 watts (class C1) using an omnidirectional antenna, while its studios are located at the Bell Media Building at 1717 René Lévesque Boulevard East in Downtown Montreal.

History

Early years (1963-1974)
CKGM-FM, as the station was originally known, was founded by Geoff Stirling as a sister station to AM station CKGM, and opened on July 16, 1963. After a few weeks as a simulcast of CKGM, CKGM-FM launched a beautiful music format on September 1, 1963.

On October 28, 1969, CKGM-FM changed its format to album-oriented rock. On-air advertising was kept at a minimum. The first song played by Doug Pringle after the format switch was Richard Strauss' "Also sprach Zarathustra", followed by The Beatles' "Here Comes the Sun". The station would change its call sign to CHOM-FM almost two years later, on October 19, 1971.

Going bilingual (1974-1977)
In 1974, CHOM proposed to the Canadian Radio-television and Telecommunications Commission a plan in which the station would become bilingual (English/French). The CRTC accepted this plan but only on an experimental basis that would last three years; it also blocked a plan to implement quadraphonic broadcasting. In 1977, the station was forced by the CRTC to opt between the two languages, and after considering becoming a French-language station, it finally reverted to English full-time. On-air advertising steadily increased during the late 1970s. Furthermore, CHOM's original format of AOR and "underground" rock tunes (many of which were longer than the average 3 minutes in length) changed to include the playing of more top 40-type hits.

Rise and fall and CHUM takeover (1979-2002)
CHOM-FM became increasingly popular, and in 1979 surpassed sister station CKGM in Bureau of Broadcast Measurement ratings. Both stations were sold to CHUM Limited on August 20, 1985.

The station acquired the rights to the syndicated show by Howard Stern which made its debut on CHOM on September 2, 1997, amid much controversy as he launched himself on his very first show heard in Montreal in an anti-Francophone/anti-French tirade. His show was cancelled a year later, on August 27, 1998, after numerous complaints to the CRTC about politically incorrect remarks interpreted by complainants as sexist and homophobic.

Return to their classic rock direction and Standard Radio takeover (2002-2007)

Effective in January 2002, the station was sold to Standard Broadcasting, which already owned CJAD and CJFM-FM in Montreal, in exchange for Standard's CFWM-FM in Winnipeg.

Astral takeover and new direction (2007-2013)
Ownership changed hands again when on October 29, 2007, Astral Media took control of Standard Broadcasting and its assets.

On October 19, 2010, CHOM celebrated its 40th anniversary as a radio station.

On June 22, 2011, it was announced that Terry DiMonte would be making a return to the station.

Bell Media
In July 2013, Astral Media was acquired and dissolved by Bell Media. With the merger, CHOM was reunited with its original AM sister station CKGM, which CTVglobemedia (now Bell Media) acquired from CHUM in 2007.

On September 22, 2017, longtime radio personality Robert "TooTall" Wagenaar retired from his mid-day show after over 40 years at CHOM. His replacement is Randy Renaud, a 30-year veteran of the radio station.

On May 28, 2021, Terry Dimonte left the station.

Location
When first launched in 1963, CHOM (then known as CKGM-FM) was originally based at 1455 Drummond Street in Montreal, along with the CKGM-AM. Like CKGM, it moved to 1310 Greene Avenue in Westmount in the late 1960s.

In 1972, CHOM relocated across the street to 1355 Greene Avenue, while CKGM opted to stay at 1310 Greene. CHOM eventually returned to the CKGM building a few years later and remained located there until its acquisition by Standard Broadcasting in 2002. At this point, CHOM was moved to 1411 Fort Street in Montreal (the building that housed Standard's other two existing Montreal radio stations, CJFM-FM and CJAD).

In September 2012, Astral Media relocated its local English-language radio stations (including CHOM) to its French-language radio studios at 1717 René Lévesque Boulevard East in Montreal.

References

External links
 CHOM 97.7
 
 
 CHOM 97.7 on FindRadio

HOM
HOM
HOM
HOM
Radio stations established in 1963
1963 establishments in Quebec